National Key Buddhist Temples in Han Chinese Area are national key ("important") Buddhist temples in areas traditionally associated with the Han Chinese in the People's Republic of China (excluding Inner Mongolia, Tibet, and Xinjiang). The list was originally released on 9 April 1983 by the State Council, and included 142 Buddhist temples, of which all in the original list are listed below.

List

North China
 Beijing: Guangji Temple, Fayuan Temple, Lingguang Temple, Guanghua Temple (Beijing), Tongjiao Temple, Yonghe Temple, Xihuang Temple
 Tianjin: Temple of Great Compassion
 Hebei: 
 Zhengding County: Linji Temple 
 Chengde: Puning Temple
 Shanxi: 
 Taiyuan: Chongshan Temple
 Datong: Huayan Temple
 Jiaocheng County: Xuanzhong Temple
 Mount Wutai: Xiantong Temple, Tayuan Temple, Pusading, Shuxiang Temple, Luohou Temple, Jinge Temple, Guangzong Temple, Bishan Temple, Shifang Temple, Dailuoding, Xixian Temple

Northeast China
 Liaoning
 Shenyang: Bore Temple, Ci'en Temple
 Jilin: 
 Changchun: Bore Temple, Dizang Temple
 Jilin City: Guanyin Ancient Temple
 Heilongjiang
 Harbin: Jile Temple

East China
 Shanghai: Jade Buddha Temple, Jing'an Temple, Longhua Temple, Chenxiang Pavilion, Yuanming Jiangtang
 Jiangsu: 
 Nanjing: Linggu Temple, Qixia Temple
 Suzhou: Xiyuan Temple, Hanshan Temple, Lingyanshan Temple
 Zhenjiang: Jinshan Temple, Dinghui Temple
 Changshu: Tianning Temple (Changzhou), Xingfu Temple
 Nantong: Guangjiao Temple
 Yangzhou: Daming Temple, Gaomin Temple
 Jurong: Longchang Temple
 Zhejiang: 
 Hangzhou: Lingyin Temple, Jingci Temple
 Ningbo: Qita Temple, Tiantong Temple, Temple of King Ashoka
 Xinchang County: Dafo Temple (Xinchang)
 Mount Putuo: Puji Temple, Fayu Temple, Huiji Temple
 Tiantai County: Guoqing Temple, Gaoming Temple, Fangguang Temple
 Wenzhou: Jiangxin Temple
 Anhui: 
 Hefei: Mingjiao Temple
 Anqing: Yingjiang Temple
 Qianshan County: Sanzu Temple
 Chuzhou: Langya Temple
 Wuhu: Guangji Temple (Wuhu)
 Mount Jiuhua: Huacheng Temple, Shrine of Living Buddha, Baisui Palace, Ganlu Temple, Zhiyuan Temple, Tiantai Temple, Zhantanlin, Huiju Temple, Shangchan Temple
 Shandong: 
 Jinan: Xingguo Temple
 Qingdao: Zhanshan Temple

South East China
 Jiangxi:
 Jiujiang: Nengren Temple, Donglin Temple (Jiangxi)
 Yongxiu County: Zhenru Temple
 Ji'an: Jingju Temple
 Fujian:
 Fuzhou: Yongquan Temple, Xichan Temple, Linyang Temple, Dizang Temple
 Minhou County: Chongsheng Temple
 Xiamen: South Putuo Temple
 Putian: Guanghua Temple (Putian), Cishou Temple, Guangxiao Temple (Putian) 
 Fuqing: Wanfu Temple
 Quanzhou: Kaiyuan Temple
 Jinjiang: Longshan Temple (Jinjiang)
 Zhangzhou: Nanshan Temple (Zhangzhou)
 Ningde: Huayan Temple.

South Central China
 Henan: 
 Luoyang: White Horse Temple
 Dengfeng: Shaolin Temple
 Hubei: 
 Wuhan: Guiyuan Temple, Baotong Temple
 Huangmei County: Wuzu Temple
 Dangyang: Yuquan Temple
 Hunan: 
 Changsha: Lushan Temple, Kaifu Temple
 Mount Heng: Zhusheng Temple, Fuyan Temple, Nantai Temple, Shangfeng Temple
 Guangdong: 
 Guangzhou: Temple of the Six Banyan Trees
 Shaoguan: Nanhua Temple
 Ruyuan County: Yunmen Temple
 Zhaoqing: Qingyun Temple
 Shantou: Lingshan Temple
 Chaozhou: Kaiyuan Temple

Southwest China
 Guangxi: 
 Guiping: Xishi Temple.
 Chongqing: Luohan Temple, Ciyun Temple
 Liangping County: Shuanggui Temple
 Sichuan: 
 Chengdu: Zhaojue Temple, Wenshu Temple, Baoguang Temple
 Leshan: Wuyou Temple
 Mount Emei: Baoguo Temple, Wannian Temple, Hongchunping Temple, Xixiang Chi, Jinding
 Guizhou: 
 Guiyang: Hongfu Temple, Qianming Temple
 Yunnan: 
 Kunming: Yuantong Temple, Qiongzhu Temple, Huating Temple
 Binchuan County: Zhusheng Temple, Tongwadian.

Northwest China
 Shaanxi: 
 Xi'an: Daci'en Temple, Daxingshan Temple, Wolong Temple, Guangren Temple, Xingjiao Temple, Xiangji Temple, Jingye Temple
 Hu County: Caotang Temple
 Ningxia: 
 Yinchuan: Temple of Haibao Pagoda

References

 
Buddhist temples in China